Willard School may refer to:

 Emma Willard School, a day and boarding school for young women in Troy, New York
 Frances E. Willard School, an elementary school in Philadelphia, Pennsylvania
 Willard Elementary School, Natrona County, Wyoming
 Willard Residential College, part of Northwestern University in Evanston, Illinois
 Willard School, original name of the Indiana School for the Deaf

See also
 Willard High School (disambiguation)